Yakhtan (Russian and Tajik: Яхтан) is a village and jamoat in north-west Tajikistan. It is located in Devashtich District in Sughd Region. The jamoat has a total population of 15,060 (2015). It consists of 7 villages, including Yakhtan (the seat), Khoja Tohir and Lolazor.

References

External links
Satellite map at Maplandia.com

Populated places in Sughd Region
Jamoats of Tajikistan